is a railway station located in the town of Happō, Akita Prefecture, Japan, operated by East Japan Railway Company (JR East).

Lines
Sawame Station  is served by the  Gonō Line, and is located 14.1 kilometers from the southern terminus of the line at Higashi-Noshiro Station.

Station layout
The station has one side platform serving a single bidirectional track. The station is unattended.

History
Sawame Station was opened on April 26, 1926 as a station on the Japanese Government Railways (JGR) serving the village of Sawame, Akita. The JGR became the JNR (Japan National Railways) after World War II. With the privatization of the JNR on April 1, 1987, the station has been managed by JR East.

Surrounding area
 
Minehama Post Office

See also
List of railway stations in Japan

References

External links

JR East station information page 

Railway stations in Japan opened in 1926
Railway stations in Akita Prefecture
Gonō Line
Happō, Akita